Tenma a Japanese X-ray astronomy satellite launched in 1983.

Tenma may also refer to:

 Tenma goddesses, twelve guardian deities in Tibetan Buddhism
 Tianma or "heavenly horse" (Japanese reading Tenma), a creature similar to Pegasus in Eastern mythology
 Mara (demon) (also known as Tenma in Japanese), a malignant celestial king who tempted Gautama Buddha
 TENMA, a house brand of Premier Farnell, used for bench power supplies and electronic measuring equipment

People with the first name
,  Japanese kickboxer
, Japanese actor

People with the surname
, Japanese boxer

People with the nickname
Tenma (musician), Indian musician

Fictional characters
 Dr. Tenma, the father/creator of Astro Boy in the Astro Boy anime and manga series
 Dr. Kenzo Tenma, a Japanese neurosurgeon character in Monster
 Pegasus Tenma, one of the protagonists in the manga and anime Saint Seiya: The Lost Canvas and Saint Seiya: Next Dimension
 Tenma Momoe, one of the main characters from Tokyo Ravens
 Tenma Tsukamoto, the female protagonist in School Rumble
 The Tenma from A Dark Rabbit Has Seven Lives
 Tenma Tsukasa and Tenma Saki, two characters from Hatsune Miku: Colorful Stage!

Japanese-language surnames
Japanese masculine given names